Kuzmanović is a Serbian surname, a patronymic derived from the South Slavic male given name Kuzman, a variant of the Greek Cosmas. Notable people with the surname include:

Danilo Kuzmanović, Serbian footballer
Rajko Kuzmanović, Bosnian Serb politician
Vladimir Kuzmanović, Serbian-born Macedonian basketball player
Zdravko Kuzmanović, Swiss-born Serbian footballer

See also
Kuzmanovski

Serbian surnames